Bojan Lugonja (born 1 August 1998) is an Austrian football player.

Club career
He made his Austrian Football First League debut for FC Liefering on 10 March 2017 in a game against FC Wacker Innsbruck.

On 18 August 2020, he joined Floridsdorfer on a season-long loan.

References

External links
 

1998 births
Austrian people of Bosnia and Herzegovina descent
Bosnia and Herzegovina emigrants to Austria
Living people
Austrian footballers
Austria youth international footballers
FC Juniors OÖ players
FC Liefering players
SV Ried players
Floridsdorfer AC players
2. Liga (Austria) players
Austrian Regionalliga players
Association football defenders